Reynard Leveridge (born 15 September 1990) is a Jamaican cricketer. He made his first-class debut for West Indies A against Sri Lanka A in Colombo on 4 October 2016. In January 2017 he was named in Jamaica's squad for the 2016–17 Regional Super50 tournament. He made his List A debut for Jamaica in the 2016–17 Regional Super50 on 24 January 2017.

References

External links
 

1990 births
Living people
Jamaican cricketers
Jamaica cricketers
Sportspeople from Kingston, Jamaica